MBC Game (Korean: MBC 게임, 엠비씨 게임) was a South Korean specialty television channel owned by MBC Plus Media. The channel primarily broadcast's programming related to video games, but it, along with its competitor Ongamenet, was well known for its extensive coverage of competitive video gaming.

The channel was discontinued on January 31, 2012, and replaced by a music channel, MBC Music.

References

External links 
  
 Introduce-MBCGame :: Inside StarCraft

Esports television
Munhwa Broadcasting Corporation television networks
Korean-language television stations
Television channels in South Korea